The Château-Thierry American Monument is a World War I memorial, dedicated in 1937, located near Château-Thierry, Aisne, France. Architecturally it is a notable example of Stripped Classicism.

Situation 
The memorial is situated upon Hill 204 and commands a wide view of the valley of the river Marne. It commemorates the achievements of United States forces that fought in the region during World War I. In 1918, the 2nd and 3rd United States Infantry Divisions took part in heavy fighting around the area during the Second Battle of the Marne, which took place during the wider German spring offensive. The 4th Marine Brigade, which made a name for itself in the Battle of Belleau Wood, fought as part of the 2nd Infantry Division. The bodies of a number of US servicemen who were killed during the fighting are interred in cemeteries nearby.
Two stone pylons mark the entrance to the memorial from Highway N-3 which runs from Paris to Château-Thierry. The monument consists of a double colonnade rising above a long terrace, as designed by Paul Philippe Cret. On its west facade are sculptured figures representing the United States and France.  The sculptor was the French-American artist Alfred Bottiau. The English inscription reads, "This monument has been erected by the United States of America to commemorate the services of her troops and those of France who fought in this region during the World War.  It stands as a lasting symbol of the friendship and cooperation between the French and American Armies." On its east facade is a map showing American military operations that took place in the region and an orientation table pointing out the significant battle sites.
The Belleau Wood US Marines monument is located near the Aisne-Marne American Cemetery, about 9.3 km northwest.

Gallery

Notes

References

External links 

 ABMC Chateau-Thierry American Monument web page
 ABMC authorization

World War I memorials in France
American Battle Monuments Commission
Paul Philippe Cret buildings
Monuments historiques of Hauts-de-France